Klemens Ludwig (23 December 1955 – 12 December 2022) was a German astrologist, writer, publicist, and Tibetan scholar.

Biography
After completing his secondary studies in Rüthen in 1975, Ludwig studied English and theology in Tübingen. In 1986, he visited Tibet for the first time and traveled there several times before his visa was refused by the Chinese government in 2004. He published numerous books and articles on Tibet.

Suffering from amyotrophic lateral sclerosis, Ludwig died on 12 December 2022, at the age of 66.

Awards
"Media Prize Astrology" of the Deutscher Astrologen-Verband (1995)

Publications
Osttimor – Das vergessene Sterben (1985)
Bedrohte Völker. Ein Lexikon nationaler und religiöser Minderheiten (1985)
Lebenslieder - Todesklagen, Ein Lesebuch vergessener Völker (1988)
Tibet - Eine Länderkunde (1989)
Tibet klagt an (1990)
Der neue Tourismus (1990)
Tibet - Glaube gegen Gewehre (1991)
Das Baltikum - Eine Länderkunde (1991)
Augenzeugen lügen nicht. Journalistenberichte: Anspruch und Wirklichkeit (1992)
Europa zerfällt, Völker ohne Staaten und der neue Nationalismus (1993)
Flüstere zu dem Felsen. Die Botschaft der Ureinwohner der Erde zur Bewahrung der Schöpfung (1993)
Phantom Atom. Abgründe der Atomtechnologie und Wege aus der Gefahr (1993)
Ethnische Minderheiten in Europa. Ein Lexikon (1995)
Osttimor – Der zwanzigjährige Krieg (1996)
Birma - Eine Länderkunde (1997)
Der Weg zum Potala, Ein Roman aus dem alten Tibet (1997)
Tibet: Schönheit - Zerstörung - Zukunft (1998)
Estland - Eine Länderkunde (1999)
Lettland - Eine Länderkunde (2000)
Perspektiven für Tibet (2000)
Das große Lexikon der Astrologie (2001)
Das Horoskop meines Kindes. Kinder in ihrer Einzigartigkeit verstehen und unterstützen (2001)
Dalai Lama – Botschafter des Mitgefühls (2008)
Das große Handbuch der Astrologie (2008)
Wenn der Eisenvogel fliegt - Tibeter im Exil (2008)
Vielvölkerstaat China - Die nationalen Minderheiten im Reich der Mitte (2009)
Die Schwarze Hofmännin: Ein Bauernkriegsroman (2010)
Die Opferrolle. Der Islam und seine Inszenierung (2011)
Gendün - Die Rückkehr des Panchen Lama (2012)
Astrologie in der Kunst - 4000 Jahre kosmische Harmonie und Ästhetik (2013)

References

1955 births
2022 deaths
Deaths from motor neuron disease
German astrologers
German writers
Tibet freedom activists
People from Warstein